Bayon is a commune in the Meurthe-et-Moselle department in northeastern France.  Bayon has been twinned with Straelen in Germany, since 7 July 1963.

Population

See also
Communes of the Meurthe-et-Moselle department

References

Communes of Meurthe-et-Moselle